Nationality words link to articles with information on the nation's poetry or literature (for instance, Irish or France).

Events

Works published
 Thomas Brown, The Late Converts Exposed, published anonymously (see The Reasons of Mr Bays Changing his Religion 1688)
 Thomas D'Urfey:
 Collin's Walk Through London and Westminster
 New Poems
 John Glanvill, Some Odes of Horace Imitated with Relation to his Majesty and the Times
 Charles Montagu, Earl of Halifax, An Epistle to the Right Honourable Charles Earl of Dorset and Middlesex, published anonymously, on William II of England's victories in Ireland
 Edmund Waller, The Maid's Tragedy Altered, a fragment, possibly intended by Waller to turn Beaumont and Fletcher's The Maides Tragedy [1619] into a comedy; with other poems
 Edward Ward, The School of Politicks; or, The Humours of a Coffee-House, anonymous

Births
Death years link to the corresponding "[year] in poetry" article:
 January 1 – Christian Falster (died 1752), Dutch poet and philologist
 1689/90 – Susanna Highmore (died 1750), English poet

Deaths
Birth years link to the corresponding "[year] in poetry" article:
 Peter Folger (born 1617), English-born American poet and maternal grandfather of Benjamin Franklin
 Keshav Pandit (born unknown), Shivaji's religious chief, Sanskrit scholar and poet 
 Franciscus Plante (born 1613), Dutch poet and chaplain
 Wang Wu (born 1632), Chinese painter and poet

See also

 Poetry
 17th century in poetry
 17th century in literature

Notes

17th-century poetry
Poetry